Eugène Archambault (14 May 1898 – 22 November 1974) was a French racing cyclist. He rode in the 1928 Tour de France.

References

1898 births
1974 deaths
French male cyclists
Place of birth missing